Gornja Toponica may refer to:

 Gornja Toponica (Niš), a village in Serbia
 Gornja Toponica (Prokuplje), a village in Serbia